Frances Reynolds is a Shillito Fellow in Assyriology at the Oriental Institute St Benet's Hall, Oxford. Her speciality is in Babylonian and Assyrian intellectual history, literature and religion, with an emphasis on the late second and first millennia BC.

Reynolds was a consultant for the BBC2 series Divine Women (2011) and the BBC series History of the World (2011–12). From 1998 she has been an honorary Research Fellow in Assyriology at the University of Birmingham.

Selected publications

References

External links
 BBC Radio 4 In Our Time, "The Epic of Gilgamesh". Reynolds on the panel with Andrew R. George and Martin Worthington.

British women historians
Fellows of St Benet's Hall, Oxford
Living people
Year of birth missing (living people)